Eric J. Palmer (born 1960) is a former Iowa State Representative from the 75th District. A Democrat, he served in the Iowa House of Representatives from 2007 to 2011.

During his last term in the Iowa House, Palmer served on the Education, Ethics, Government Oversight (Joint), and Natural Resources committees.  He also served as vice chair of the Judiciary Committee and of the Justice Systems Appropriations Subcommittee and as a member of the Healthy and Well Kids in Iowa (HAWK-I) Board.

Palmer ran for the Iowa House in 2004, losing to incumbent Republican Danny Carroll, the Speaker pro tempore.  In 2006, Palmer defeated Carroll in a rematch and began his term in the House.  He defeated Carroll again in 2008, but lost to Republican opponent Guy Vander Linden in 2010.

Electoral history
*incumbent

References

External links

Representative Eric Palmer official Iowa General Assembly site
Eric Palmer for Iowa House official campaign site
 

Living people
People from Oskaloosa, Iowa
Drake University alumni
Democratic Party members of the Iowa House of Representatives
Place of birth missing (living people)
1960 births